Might as Well Be Dead is a Nero Wolfe detective novel by Rex Stout, published by the Viking Press in 1956. The story was also collected in the omnibus volume Three Aces (Viking 1971).

Plot introduction
Nero Wolfe is hired to find a missing person, who soon turns up — under a new name — as a newly convicted murderer in a sensational crime.

Plot summary
As the book opens, James R. Herold, prosperous businessman from Omaha, Nebraska, consults Wolfe about re-establishing contact with his son, whom he had (as it eventually transpired) falsely accused of theft eleven years before. The son, Paul Herold, had consequently broken almost all ties with the family, changed his name and moved to New York City. Even the latter meagre information was only known because Paul has recently sent his sister a birthday card postmarked NYC. The father has already taken obvious steps such as an ad in the newspaper and consulting the Missing Persons Dept of NYPD.

Although the present name of Paul Herold is unknown, Wolfe suspects that he has at least retained the same initials, and therefore places an advertisement in the newspapers the following day advising PH that he is innocent of the crime of which he was once suspected.

Needless to day, more than one person with those initials thinks he his falsely accused of a crime, and the advertisement attracts many telephone calls to Wolfe's office the next day.

The advertisement is also silent about the crime of which the man is innocent.

Meanwhile, a man known as Peter Hays has been on trial for murder, and the case is already with the jury, and a verdict is expected soon. Wolfe and Archie Goodwin are sufficiently distracted by enquiries about Peter Hays being the man named in the advertisement (and that he is by implication innocent of the murder for which Hays is currently being tried) that Wolfe dispatches Archie to visit the court room to hear the verdict against Hays. By comparing the man he sees in court to photos supplied by the father, Archie tentatively identifies the two names as referring to the same man.

This sets up a confrontation with Hays' attorney, Albert Freyer, who suspects Archie of duplicity (since Archie earlier told Freyer, among others, that the advertisement referred to a different crime, not the murder of Michael Molloy for which Hays has just been tried), but Wolfe and Freyer, after some discussion, quickly come to an agreement on how to proceed to the best advantage of all concerned:
 Although Wolfe might collect a substantial fee by immediately notifying his client that his son has been found (albeit in mortal jeopardy), Archie's identification is still not certain, and Wolfe's client would be more satisfied if he was able to deliver the son as a free man. 
 Peter Hays has refused to give his lawyer any information on his background, something that counted against him with the district attorney, and seems depressed to the point of hopelessness, using the novel's title Might as well be dead to describe how he feels. This tends to validate Archie's tentative identification, but a personal meeting of Archie with Hays would be needed to be sure.
 Peter Hays has limited funds, and although Freyer is convinced of his client's innocence, it would be vastly preferable to have help both in the form of Wolfe's assistance and the financial backing of the father.
 Therefore, Freyer will start an appeal (initial steps are not costly) and meanwhile Wolfe will work on clearing Hays/Herold, and delay informing Wolfe's client for the time being.

Later on, Wolfe sends some of his operatives, including Johnny Keems, to investigate some of the friends and associates of Michael Molloy. The next day, the body of Johnny Keems is found killed by a hit-and-run driver. Since his pockets lack $100 in money Archie gave him to bribe potential witnesses, Wolfe and Archie consider it to be linked the Molloy murder, but the authorities make no such connection since the apparent murderer of Molloy has already been convicted. But as more persons connected to Molloy are found dead, Wolfe and Archie must find the evidence to free Hays before the murderer, now no more than a maniac, can eliminate everyone who might expose the truth.

Cast of characters
 Archie Goodwin — amanuensis to Nero Wolfe
 James R. Herold — businessman from Omaha
 Nero Wolfe — detective afflicted by sitzenlust, orchid fancier, and chef
 Lieutenant Murphy — an NYPD officer in the Missing Persons Bureau of the NYPD
 Purley Stebbins — Sergeant in the NYC Homicide Squad
 Albert Freyer — defense lawyer for Peter Hays in the murder trial
 Paul Herold  son of James Herold; wrongly accused of theft 11 years before
 Peter Hays — a man on trial for murder; alias of Paul Herold
 Michael Molloy — decedent. As the book opens, Peter Hays is being tried for Molloy's murder
 Selma Molloy — wife of Michael Molloy, in love with Peter Hays
 Saul Panzer, Fred Durkin, Orrie Cather — private detectives often called upon by Wolfe
 Johnny Keems — A recurring character similar to Panzer, Durkin and Cather in earlier Nero Wolfe novels
 Delia Brandt — secretary and possible mistress of Michael Molloy
 Thomas Irwin and Fanny Irwin — friends of Selma Malloy
 Jerome Arkoff and Rita Arkoff — friends of Selma Molloy living in the same building as the Irwins
 Ella Reyes — live-out housekeeper of the Irwins
 William Lesser — Fiancé of Delia Brandt
 Inspector Cramer — head of the Manhattan Homicide Squad
 Patrick Degan — treasurer of a major trade union, friend and business partner of Michael Molloy

Adaptations

Television

Nero Wolfe (Paramount Television)
Might as Well Be Dead was adapted as the fifth episode of Nero Wolfe (1981), an NBC TV series starring William Conrad as Nero Wolfe and Lee Horsley as Archie Goodwin. Other members of the regular cast include George Voskovec (Fritz Brenner), Robert Coote (Theodore Horstmann), George Wyner (Saul Panzer) and Allan Miller (Inspector Cramer). Guest stars include Gail Youngs (Margaret [Selma] Molloy), Bruce Gray (Patrick Degan), A.C. Weary (Peter Hays), Michael Currie (Albert Freyer), Lana Wood (Delia Brandt), Stephen Elliott (Mr. Herold) and John de Lancie (Tom Irwin). Directed by George McCowan from a teleplay by Seeleg Lester, "Might as Well Be Dead" aired February 13, 1981.

Stage

Might as Well Be Dead (2017)
A stage adaptation of Might as Well Be Dead was commissioned by Park Square Theatre in Saint Paul, Minnesota. The second stage production to be authorized by the estate of Rex Stout, Might as Well Be Dead: A Nero Wolfe Mystery was written by Joseph Goodrich and directed by Peter Moore, who were also responsible for an adaptation of The Red Box at the same theater in 2014. E.J. Subkoviak (Nero Wolfe), Michael Paul Levin (Inspector Cramer) and Jim Pounds (Fritz Brenner) reprised their roles; Archie Goodwin was played by Derek Dirlam. Previews began on June 16, 2017, and the production ran June 23 – July 30, 2017.

Publication history
1956, New York: Viking Press, October 26, 1956, hardcover
In his limited-edition pamphlet, Collecting Mystery Fiction #10, Rex Stout's Nero Wolfe Part II, Otto Penzler describes the first edition of Might as Well Be Dead: "Bright blue-green boards, chartreuse cloth spine, printed with blue-green; front and rear covers blank. Issued in a mainly blue pictorial dust wrapper."
In April 2006, Firsts: The Book Collector's Magazine estimated that the first edition of Might as Well Be Dead had a value of between $200 and $350. The estimate is for a copy in very good to fine condition in a like dustjacket.
1957, New York: Viking Press (Mystery Guild), February 1957, hardcover
The far less valuable Viking book club edition may be distinguished from the first edition in three ways:
 The dust jacket has "Book Club Edition" printed on the inside front flap, and the price is absent (first editions may be price clipped if they were given as gifts).
 Book club editions are sometimes thinner and always taller (usually a quarter of an inch) than first editions.
 Book club editions are bound in cardboard, and first editions are bound in cloth (or have at least a cloth spine).
1957, London: Collins Crime Club, 1957, hardcover
1958, New York: Bantam #A1795, July 1958, paperback
1971, New York: The Viking Press, Three Aces: A Nero Wolfe Omnibus (with Too Many Clients and The Final Deduction), May 10, 1971, hardcover
1973, London: Fontana, April 1973
1995, New York: Bantam Books  January 2, 1995, paperback
2004, Auburn, California: The Audio Partners Publishing Corp., Mystery Masters  November 2004, audio CD (unabridged, read by Michael Prichard)
2010, New York: Bantam  April 28, 2010, e-book

References

External links

1956 American novels
Nero Wolfe novels by Rex Stout
Novels set in New York City
Viking Press books